Wadhel Khuda Bakhashwala is a village in Sultanpur Lodhi tehsil in Kapurthala district of Punjab, India. The village is administrated by a Sarpanch who is an elected representative of village as per the constitution of India and Panchayati raj (India).

Demography 
According to the report published by Census India in 2011, Mira has 6 houses with the total population of 27 persons of which 17 are male and 10 females. Literacy rate of Mira is 70.37%, lower than the state average of 75.84%.  The population of children in the age group 0–6 years is zero which is  0.00% of the total population.  Child sex ratio is approximately 0, lower than the state average of 846.

Population data

Work Profile 
In Wadhel Khuda Bakhashwala village out of total population, 7 were engaged in work activities.  85.71% of workers describe their work as Main Work (Employment or Earning more than 6 Months) while 14.29% were involved in Marginal activity providing livelihood for less than 6 months.

Caste 
The village Wadhel Khuda Bakhashwala currently doesn’t have any Schedule Caste (SC) and Schedule Tribe (ST) population.

References

List of cities near the village 
Bhulath
Kapurthala 
Phagwara 
Sultanpur Lodhi

Air travel connectivity 
The closest International airport to the village is Sri Guru Ram Dass Jee International Airport.

External links
 Villages in Kapurthala
 List of Villages in Kapurthala Tehsil

Kapurthala State
Populated places in Punjab, India
Villages in Kapurthala district